The rivière à Pat (in English: Pat River) is a tributary on the east bank of the Nicolet Southwest River. It crosses the municipalities of Sainte-Élizabeth-de-Warwick, Sainte-Séraphine and Sainte-Clotilde-de-Horton in the Arthabaska Regional County Municipality (MRC), in the administrative region of Estrie, in Quebec, in Canada.

Geography 

The main neighboring hydrographic slopes of the Pat river are:
 north side: Nicolet Southwest River, Nicolet River;
 east side: Nicolet River, rivière des Rosiers;
 south side: Léon-Gélinas stream, Dubuc stream, Nicolet Southwest River;
 west side: Nicolet Southwest River.

The Rivière à Pat originates from various streams in the municipality of Sainte-Élizabeth-de-Warwick, very close to the limit of the municipality of Kingsey Falls.

  north-west, in the municipality of Sainte-Élizabeth-de-Warwick, to the intermunicipal limit of Sainte-Séraphine;
  north-west, up to the municipal limit of Sainte-Clotilde-de-Horton;

The Rivière à Pat drains on the east bank of the Nicolet Southwest River.

Toponymy 
The toponym "Rivière à Pat" was formalized on September 5, 1985, at the Commission de toponymie du Québec.

See also 
 Lake Saint-Pierre
 List of rivers of Quebec

References 

Rivers of Centre-du-Québec
Arthabaska Regional County Municipality